The 2007 Heineken Open was an ATP Tour tennis tournament held on outdoor hard courts at the ASB Tennis Centre in Auckland, New Zealand from 8 January until 15 January 2007.

The tournament saw third-seeded David Ferrer claim his first of three tournaments this year, which was also his first hardcourt final.

Finals

 David Ferrer defeated  Tommy Robredo, 6–4, 6–2

Doubles

 Jeff Coetzee /  Rogier Wassen defeated  Simon Aspelin /  Chris Haggard, 6–7(9–11), 6–3, [10–2]

See also 
 2007 ASB Classic – women's tournament

References

External links 
 
 Singles draw
 Doubles draw
 ATP – tournament profile